A. B. Miller High School is one of five high schools in the Fontana Unified School District that services students in the Fontana area of California.

History
A.B. Miller High School is named after Azariel Blanchard Miller (1878–1941) who is credited as the founder of the city of Fontana.  In 1905, he brought 200 head of horse, mules, plows, scrapers and tents into the area and began transforming 17,000 acres of sand, sage brush and rock into a great citrus fruit, poultry and livestock farm.

As of June 2020, Principal Dustin Saxton announced that the school would be removing all instances of the Rebel mascot and mentions of Rebel Nation.

Academic performance
In March 2010, Fontana A.B. Miller High School was placed on a list of the lowest performing high schools in the state. A transformation model was put in place in the school, which called for the replacement of the principal and rewarding teachers based on student performance. The principal was not replaced at that time, however, due to being on the job less than 2 years.

A.B. Miller emerged as model school after the SIG process and increased its API score 104 points over the course of the grant.  Today, A.B. Miller continues to emphasize student achievement and has implemented programs to enrich students of all levels.  Students who need to build their academic capacity are enrolled in intervention courses in Math and English aimed at developing their academic skills.  Students are also exposed to a-g approved college prep and Advanced Placement courses that are designed to create college-ready students. In addition, students have the choice to enroll in enrichment courses designed to create a well-rounded individual; these courses include: Marine Biology, Astronomy, Sociology, Psychology, Health and Fitness, Yoga, Dance conservatory, Anthropology, and Drama.

A.B. Miller also offers a strong AVID program whose teachers have ensured 100% of the students in the program are accepted to a four-year university.  The school also offers three courses/programs designed to build leadership skills within the student body; these programs include ASB, Link Crew, and Peer Leaders. Lastly, the school's athletic program affords students the opportunity to participate in the following sports: Football, Boys and Girls Cross Country, Girls Volleyball, Boys and Girls Golf, Boys and Girls Tennis, Boys and Girls Basketball, Boys and Girls Soccer, Boys and Girls Track & Field, and Boys and Girls Wrestling.

Demographics
Out of the 3,006 students enrolled during the 2008–2009 school year, the ethnic breakdown was:

 8.3% African-American
 7.5% Caucasian
 0.9% Asian
 81.6% Hispanic or Latino
 1.7% Others

Notable alumni
 Abe Alvarez, former professional baseball pitcher with Palfinger Reggio Emilia of Italy's Serie A1
 Jesse Chavez, Major League Baseball player for Los Angeles Angels, Los Angeles Dodgers, Oakland Athletics
 Jermaine Curtis, Former Major League Baseball for the St. Louis Cardinals
 Alan Harper, pro football player, Arena Bowl champion
 Alexis Serna, Canadian Football League player
 Nick Barnett, NFL player for Green Bay Packers and Washington Redskins
 Bobby Green, 2-time All-American wrestler; professional Mixed Martial Artist for UFC

References

External links
 Official website
 2008-2009 School Accountability Report Card

Education in Fontana, California
High schools in San Bernardino County, California
Public high schools in California
1991 establishments in California
Educational institutions established in 1991